Oleksandr Horin (born 11 November 1956) is a Ukrainian diplomat, who was a Deputy Minister of Foreign Affairs of Ukraine (in 2008) and he was Ukraine's ambassador to the Netherlands from March 2011 until March 2017 (a post he combined with being the permanent representative of Ukraine in the  Organisation for the Prohibition of Chemical Weapons).

Horin has a wife and two children.

References

1956 births
Ambassadors of Ukraine to South Korea
Ambassadors of Ukraine to the Netherlands
Living people
Politicians from Donetsk
Taras Shevchenko National University of Kyiv, Institute of International Relations alumni